Akṣayamati (also called Inexhaustible Awareness) is a bodhisattva who appears in the Lotus Sutra and the Akṣayamatinirdeśa Sūtra within the larger Mahāvaipulya Mahāsamghāta Sūtra.

He is recognized as one of the sixteen bodhisattvas of the auspicious aeon (bhadrakalpa). He also has the ability to perceive and understand all actions of cause and effect (Skt. aparuṣā).

Lotus Sutra
In Chapter 25 of the Lotus Sutra, Akṣayamati asks the Buddha to elaborate on the character of the bodhisattva Avalokiteśvara.

After receiving a detailed explanation on the Bodhisattva's wanderings throughout the world, Akṣayamati offers Avalokiteśvara a pearl necklace of great value. Avalokiteśvara refuses at first, but Akṣayamati entreats him to accept it for the Dharma, out of compassion. Avalokiteśvara finally accepts the necklace out of compassion for the fourfold assembly, devas, nāgas, yakshas, gandharvas, asuras, garudas, kinnaras, mahoragas, humans, non-humans, etc.

Sources
 
 

Bodhisattvas